The 1908 United States presidential election in Oregon took place on November 3, 1908. All contemporary 46 states were part of the 1908 United States presidential election. State voters chose four electors to the Electoral College, which selected the president and vice president.

Polls always said that Oregon, which had voted Democratic only once over twelve presidential elections since statehood, would ultimately be easily retained by Taft. Despite differences with the state GOP, a New York Times opinion poll continued to show a Taft victory as certain, although The Washington Post was much less certain. Ultimately, however, Taft would repeat Roosevelt's feat of sweeping every county in Oregon, but his winning margin was less than half as large as that by which Alton Brooks Parker had been defeated in 1904.

Bryan had previously lost Oregon twice to Republican William McKinley in both 1896 and 1900.

Background
Oregon had been earlier in the 1900s solidified as a one-party Republican bastion, which it would remain at a Presidential level apart from the 1910s GOP split until Franklin D. Roosevelt rose to power in 1932, and apart from a very short New Deal interlude at state level until the “Revolution of 1954”. Democratic representation in the Oregon legislature would never exceed fifteen percent during this period except for the above-mentioned 1930s interlude, and Republican primaries would become the chief mode of competition.

The Beaver State's few Democrats pledged themselves to Bryan – who had been the last Democratic presidential candidate to carry any of the state's counties – in June. In contrast, Senator Jonathan Bourne wanted incumbent President Theodore Roosevelt to run for effectively a third term;  however once it was clear that Taft would be the GOP nominee Bourne campaigned for him vigorously in spite of his history as a “silver Republican” who backed Bryan in 1896.

Results

Results by county

See also
 United States presidential elections in Oregon

Notes

References

Oregon
1908
1908 Oregon elections